Mount Rossel is a mountain, 2,250 m, standing 3 nautical miles (6 km) southwest of Mount Perov in the Belgica Mountains. Discovered by the Belgian Antarctic Expedition, 1957-58, under G. de Gerlache, who named it for Mlle. Marie-Thérèse Rossel, a patron of the expedition.
 

Mountains of Queen Maud Land
Princess Ragnhild Coast